Five Little Peppers and How They Grew is a 1939 American black-and-white children's comedy drama film directed by Charles Barton, produced by Jack Fier and based on the novel of the same name by Margaret Sidney. Starring Edith Fellows, Charles Peck, Tommy Bond, Jimmy Leake and Dorothy Anne Seese, it is the first of four Five Little Peppers films.

Plot
Mrs. Pepper and her five children Polly, Ben, Joey, Davie and Phronsie are a poor but happy family. Mrs. Pepper's husband John, a mine engineer, died when the copper mine that he half-owned caved in. Teenage Polly inherited her father's share of the mine, which her father wished for her to keep at least until she comes of age, although he never found copper in the mine. Polly looks after the other Pepper children while Mrs. Pepper is at work. By chance, Polly and Joey meet rich but lonely teenager Jasper King, who befriends the Pepper children. Jasper lives with his wealthy grandfather J.H. King, who ignores Jasper as he is obsessed with making money to the exclusion of all else. J.H. has no interest in Jasper befriending the Peppers until he learns about who they are. J.H. has bought the other half of the mine and wants Polly's half as cheaply as possible to start more exploration. Hiding his true intentions, J.H. starts spending time with the Peppers, plying them with gifts. With an outbreak of measles, Jasper and J.H spend more time with the Peppers than they had expected and the Pepper children grow to love them.

Cast
Edith Fellows as Polly
Charles Peck as Ben
Tommy Bond as Joey
Jimmy Leake as Davie
Dorothy Ann Seese as Phronsie
Dorothy Peterson as Mrs. Pepper
Ronald Sinclair as Jasper
Clarence Kolb as Mr. King
Leonard Carey as Martin
Bruce Bennett as chauffeur (uncredited)

References

External links

1939 films
Columbia Pictures films
American black-and-white films
Films directed by Charles Barton
American comedy-drama films
1939 comedy-drama films
1930s English-language films
1930s American films